CAAP is an acronym that may refer to:
 Civil Aviation Authority of the Philippines
 Clinical Associate in Applied Psychology, a type of British medical specialist; usually shortened to Clinical Associate (Psychology)
 Coalition of African American Pastors
 Communauté d'Agglomération du Pays d'Aix-en-Provence (Communes of the Bouches-du-Rhône department)
Contemporary Asian Australian Performance, theatre company resident at Carriageworks in Sydney